Go for Broke is a 2002 urban comedy film, written by Jean-Claude La Marre, who also directed and co-produced the film, which stars Pras, Michael A. Goorjian, LisaRaye, Kira Madallo Sesay and Bobby Brown.

Plot
Two guys have the winning ticket in a lottery, but the ticket is taken by a woman robbing the restaurant they're in, who swallows the ticket before getting arrested.  The guys come up with a scheme to recover the ticket by committing a felony while impersonating women so as to be sent to the same women's penitentiary as the robber.

External links
 
 
 

2002 films
2002 comedy films
African-American comedy films
American prison comedy films
Artisan Entertainment films
Cross-dressing in American films
2000s English-language films
Films directed by Jean-Claude La Marre
2000s American films